Öxarárfoss is a waterfall in Þingvellir National Park, Iceland. It flows from the river Öxará over the Almannagjá . The pool at the base of the waterfall is filled with rocks and is often extremely icy during winter.

The waterfall is one of the main attractions of Þingvellir National Park and there is a path from the nearby car park leading up to it.

In culture 
An edited photograph of the waterfall by David Carson is used as the cover of Nine Inch Nails's album The Fragile. A pixelated version is used on The Fragile: Deviations 1, an expanded instrumental version of said album.

References

External links

Waterfalls of Iceland
Southern Region (Iceland)